The Percidae are a family of ray-finned fish, part of the order Perciformes, which are found in fresh and brackish waters of the Northern Hemisphere. The majority are Nearctic, but there are also Palearctic species. The family contains more than 200 species in 11 genera. The perches, and their relatives are in this family; well-known species include the walleye, sauger, ruffe, and three species of perch.  However, small fish known as darters are also a part of this family.

Characteristics
The family is characterised by having the dorsal fin split into two which are normally separated or have a narrow connection, although this is wider in the genus Zingel, the front section contains the spines and the rear section contains the soft rays. The anal fin contains 1 or 2 spines, if there is a second spine it is typically weak. The pelvic fins are placed on the thorax and have a single spine and 5 soft rays. They also have skeletal synapomorphies. Their scales are ctenoid and their bodies are normally somewhat elongate.

Systematics
The 5th Edition of Fishes of the World classifies the Percidae into five subfamilies and Fishbase recognises 239 species in 11 genera.

 Subfamily Percinae Rafinesque, 1815
 Genus Perca Linnaeus, 1758
 Subfamily Acerinae Bleeker, 1858
 Genus Gymnocephalus Bloch, 1793
 Subfamily Percarininae  Gill, 1861
 Genus Percarina Nordmann, 1840
 Subfamily Luciopercinae Jordan & Evermann, 1896
 Tribe Luciopercini Jordan & Evermann 1896
 Genus Sander Oken, 1817
 Tribe Romanichthyini Dumitrescu, Bănărescu & Stoica 1957
 Genus Romanichthys Dumitrescu, Bănărescu & Stoica 1957
 Genus Zingel Cloquet, 1817
 Subfamily Etheostomatinae Agassiz, 1850
 Genus Ammocrypta Jordan, 1877
 Genus Etheostoma Rafinesque, 1817
 Genus Nothonotus Putnam, 1863
 Genus Percina Haldeman, 1842

Fossil genera
 †Mioplosus Cope, 1877
 †Priscacara Cope, 1877

References

 
Perciformes families
Taxa named by Constantine Samuel Rafinesque